Sanatorny (masculine), Sanatornaya (feminine), or Sanatornoye (neuter) is the name of several inhabited localities in Russia.

Urban localities
Sanatornoye, Republic of Crimea, an urban-type settlement under the administrative jurisdiction of the town of republic significance of Yalta in the Republic of Crimea

Rural localities
Sanatorny, Kartalinsky District, Chelyabinsk Oblast, a settlement in Annensky Selsoviet of Kartalinsky District in Chelyabinsk Oblast
Sanatorny, Yetkulsky District, Chelyabinsk Oblast, a settlement in Pechenkinsky Selsoviet of Yetkulsky District in Chelyabinsk Oblast
Sanatorny, Chuvash Republic, a settlement in Chuvarleyskoye Rural Settlement of Alatyrsky District in the Chuvash Republic
Sanatorny, Irkutsk Oblast, a settlement in Shelekhovsky District of Irkutsk Oblast
Sanatorny, Novosibirsk Oblast, a settlement in Iskitimsky District of Novosibirsk Oblast; 
Sanatorny, Sverdlovsk Oblast, a settlement in Baltymsky Selsoviet under the administrative jurisdiction of the Town of Verkhnyaya Pyshma in Sverdlovsk Oblast
Sanatornoye, Sakhalin Oblast, a selo under the administrative jurisdiction of the city of oblast significance of Yuzhno-Sakhalinsk in Sakhalin Oblast
Sanatornaya, a village in Lesnikovsky Selsoviet of Ketovsky District in Kurgan Oblast;

Notes